Deiva Balam is a 1959 Indian Tamil-language film directed by P. Vasanthakumar Reddy. The film stars K. Balaji and Jayashree. This film is partly coloured by Gevacolor.

Plot

Cast 
The following list is compiled from the database of Film News Anandan and from the book Thiraikalanjiyam Part-1.

Male cast
K. Balaji
K. Sarangapani
Kaka Radhakrishnan
V. R. Rajagopal
Gummadi

Female cast
Jayashree
Girija
K. Malathi
Padmini Priyadarshini

Production 
The film was produced by Ponnaloori Brothers under their own banner and was directed by P. Vasanthakumar Reddy. Uthayakumar wrote the dialogues. Cinematography was done by B. J. Reddy and W. R. Subba Rao while Rajan did the editing. D. Venugopalasamy handled the choreography. The film was made in Telugu with the title Daiva Balam with N. T. Rama Rao and Jayashree starring. This film was partly coloured by Eastmancolor, making it one of the earliest Indian film to have sequences in Eastmancolor.

Soundtrack 
Music was composed by G. Aswathama and the lyrics were penned by A. Maruthakasi, Thanjai N. Ramaiah Dass and Lakshmanadas.

Release 
Deiva Balam was released on 11 July 1959, delayed from June.

References

External links 
 

1950s Tamil-language films